Stephen 'Steve' Poleskie (born 1938 in Pringle, Pennsylvania) was an artist and writer. The son of a high school teacher, Poleskie graduated from Wilkes University in 1959 with a degree in Economics. A self-taught artist, Poleskie had his first one-person show at the Everhart Museum, Scranton, Pennsylvania in 1958, while still in college. These works were largely abstract expressionistic in nature.

Beginning of the artistic career
After graduation Poleskie was employed briefly in Wilkes-Barre, Pennsylvania, as an insurance agent and commercial artist, before moving to Miami where he worked as a designer in a screen-printing shop.  He remained in Florida only three months before leaving for the Bahamas and Cuba. His next job was as an art teacher at Gettysburg High School where David Eisenhower was one of his students. During this time he exhibited at the Duo Gallery in New York, and the Pennsylvania Academy of Fine Arts in Philadelphia. Leaving Gettysburg, Poleskie drove to Mexico and California, returning to Pennsylvania, via Canada.

Move to New York and founding Chiron Press 
In 1962 Poleskie took a studio on 10th Street in New York City. At that time the New York School of art, also called the Tenth Street School, because most of the galleries were located on or near this street on Manhattan's lower East Side, was considered the dominant art movement in the world. Rather than join the ranks of the Abstract Expressionists, Poleskie enrolled in art classes at The New School with the figurative painter Raphael Soyer.

Poleskie and Soyer soon became friends, and Soyer painted several paintings of his student. At the time, Poleskie had abandoned his abstract painting and was doing figurative work. When Poleskie had his first one-person show in New York at Morris Gallery, Soyer bought a painting. Morris later sold a large Poleskie to the playwright Lanford Wilson.

Involved in the New York art scene, Poleskie became friends with many of the artists and critics of the day including, Elaine and Willem de Kooning, Frank O'Hara, and Louise Nevelson. In 1963 Poleskie opened a screen-printing studio in a storefront on East 11th Street. This became Chiron Press , the first fine-art screen-printing shop in New York. The business was soon moved to larger quarters at 76 Jefferson Street. During the five years he ran the operation the names of the artists who had prints made at Chiron Press reads like a who's who of the artists of the 60s and includes such figures as Robert Rauschenberg, Roy Lichtenstein, Andy Warhol, James Rosenquist, Alex Katz, Robert Motherwell, and Helen Frankenthaler. One of the printers at Chiron Press was the young artist Brice Marden.

Poleskie's own screen prints from this time, rather minimal landscapes, the figures of the earlier works having walked out of the picture, were purchased by numerous museums including the Metropolitan Museum, the Museum of Modern Art, and the Whitney Museum, in New York, and the National Collection in

Aerobatic performances

In 1968, wanting more time to devote to his own art, Poleskie sold Chiron Press and accepted a teaching position at Cornell University in Ithaca, NY. It was here that he learned to fly, and developed his Aerial Theater, a unique art-in-the-sky form, for which he is best known. In his Aerial Theater performances Poleskie flew an aerobatic biplane, trailing smoke, through a series of maneuvers to create a four-dimensional design in the sky, e.g. in Hollywood/FL (1983), Richmond (1985), Southampton (1989), Clemson (1989). Musicians, dancers, and parachutists often accompanied these pieces. This work was very popular in Europe, especially Italy, where Poleskie lived on and off for over three years.

Italian art critic Enrico Crispolti called Aerial Theater the logical extension of Futurism, and the French art critic Pierre Restany, writing in the Italian art magazine D’ars dubbed it "Planetary Art" on the scale with Christo’s installations. Poleskie's biplane and drawings for various performances were exhibited at the Louis K. Meisel Gallery in New York in 1978 and 1979.

Twenty-seven years after he began to fly, in 1998, having reached the age of sixty, and feeling his body could no longer take the excessive G forces imposed on it by the aerobatic maneuvers, Poleskie ceased flying altogether, and sold his airplanes. Works on paper from his Aerial Theater period are in many public collections including the Victoria and Albert Museum, and the Tate Gallery in London; the Kunstverin in Kassel, Germany, the Castlevecchio in Verona, Italy, and the State Museum, in Lodz, Poland.

Poleskie's work has been exhibited widely. Among the cities he has had his work shown, or done performances, are New York, Boston, Washington D. C., Los Angeles, San Francisco, Berkeley, Toledo, Richmond, Williamsburg, San Antonio, and Miami, in the USA; London, Southampton, Loughborough, and the Isle of Wight in the UK; Rome, Milan, Bologna, Brescia, Como, Trento, Turin, Verona, and Palermo in Italy; Munich, Stuttgart, and Kassel, in Germany; Linz in Austria; Ljubljana, Zagreb, and Belgrade, in the former Yugoslavia; Moscow and Saint Petersburg in Russia; Warsaw, Gdansk, and Lodz, in Poland; Tbilisi in the Republic of Georgia; Vilnius in Lithuania; Freetown in Sierra Leone; Stockholm in Sweden; Rio de Janeiro in Brazil; Tegucigalpa and San Pedro Sula in Honduras; Barcelona, Madrid, and Cadaque in Spain; Locarno in Switzerland; and Tokyo and Kyoto in Japan.

Writing fiction
Since 1998 Poleskie has been devoting himself mainly to writing fiction, including a biographical novel on the Civil War Balloonist Thaddeus S. C. Lowe.

In 2000 he destroyed a vast number of his early art works, and withdrew all the rest from the market. In 2004 Poleskie took up digital photography, and had his first show of these images in Ithaca in January 2006.

Stephen Poleskie was married to the author Jeanne Mackin. The couple lived in Ithaca, New York.

Additional information on Poleskie can be found in Who's Who in America, (2006) and Who's Who in the World, (2006) and on his web site, www.stephenpoleskie.com

Death 
Steve Poleskie passed away on December 21, 2019. He is survived by his widow, Jeanne Mackin.

Bibliography
 Poleskie, Stephen (2007) The Balloonist: The Story of T. S. C. Lowe---Inventor, Scientist, Magician, and Father of the U.S. Air Force, Frederic C. Beil, Publisher, Savannah, Georgia, 
 Poleskie, Stephen (2008)  The Third Candidate, Wasteland Press, Shelbyville, KY, 
 Poleskie, Stephen (2009) Grater Life, Wasteland Press, Shelbyville, KY,

References

Further reading 
 Hildibrand, June (1967) Artists Proof, the Annual of Prints and Printmaking, Pratt Graphics Center, NY, and Barre Publishers, MA Silkscreen Printing by Steve Poleskie, p 78-82, 1 black and white reproduction A Note on Chiron Press, p 83-4
 various authors (1968) Artists Proof, the Annual of Prints and Printmaking, Pratt Graphics Center, NY, and Barre Publishers, MA, Poleskie, Steve, tipped in screen print (4 colors) p 7
 Biegeleisen, J. I. (1971) Screen Printing, Watson-Guptill Publications, New York, Poleskie, Steve, p 34, one black and white reproduction
 Eichenberg, Fritz (1976) The Art of the Print, Harry N. Abrams, Publishers, New York, Poleskie, Steve, p 489, 510-11, 578, one page reproduction (color) 542
 Eichenberg, Fritz (1978) Lithography and Silkscreen, Harry N. Abrams, Publishers, New York, Poleskie, Steve, p 123, 152-153, one page reproduction (color) 133
 Images of an Era: the American Poster 1945-1975, National Collection of Fine Arts, Smithsonian Institution, Washington, D. C., 1976, Poleskie, Steve, one page reproduction, (color) p 98, from MOMA Collection
 American Art Directory, 50th Edition, edited by Jaques Cattell Press, R. R. Browker, New York & London, 1984, Poleskie, Steve, p 664
 Ackerman, Diane (1985) On Extended Wings, Athenum, New York, 
 Zeitlin, Marilyn, (1985) Steve Poleskie, Drawings and Collages, Marilyn Zietlin, introduction; Peter Frank, essay, Anderson Gallery, Virginia Commonwealth University, Richmond, VA, catalog, 11 black and white reproductions
 Kimpel, Harald (1986) Himmelsschreiber, Dimensionen Eines Flüchtigen Mediums Jonas Verlag, Marburg, Germany, Poleskie, Steve, p 83, 105-114, 10 black and white reproductions
 Crispolti, Enrico (1987) Steve Poleskie, Galleria Schneider, Roma, catalog, 1 color, 1 black and white reproduction
 Krantz, Les (1987) The New York Art Review, Les Krantz, American References, Chicago, Poleskie, Steve, p 1016, reproduction, (black & white) p 1046
 Foster, Stephen and Lurie, Alison (1989) Steve Poleskie, Artflyer, John Hansard Gallery, The University of Southampton, UK, 1989, catalog, 8 color reproductions
 Meyer, Jon (1989) Steve Poleskie, Artflyer, Clemson University, catalog, 3 color, and 5 black and white reproductions
 Dantzic, Cynthis Maris (1990) Design Dimensions, Prentice-Hall, New Jersey, Poleskie, Steve, p 296 reproduction (black & white)
 Who's Who In American Art, 1991–1992, 19th Edition, R.R. Bowker, New Providence, NJ, Poleskie, Stephen Francis, 884, also 1993, 94, 95, 96, etc.
 Rebeschini, Claudio (1994) Crali Aeropittore,  Electra, Milano, 1994, Poleskie, Steve, p 255, photograph of Poleskie, (black & white)
 Corlett, Mary Lee (1994) The Prints of Roy Lichtenstein, National Gallery of Art, Washington, D.C. Hudson Hills Press, New York, Poleskie, Stephen, p 25, 80, 81, 82, 257,
 Ackerman, Diane and Mackin, Jeanne (1998)The Book of Love, W. W. Norton, New York, Poleskie, Stephen F., Love and Janus Zyvka, short story, p 243-246
 Mishlove, Jeffery (2000)The PK Man, A True Story of Mind Over Matter, Hampton Roads Publishers, Charlottesville, VA, Poleskie, Stephen, p 33-34
 Overview, (2001) University of Buffalo Art Gallery, Buffalo, Steve Poleskie, p 49, 1 color reproduction
 Pisano, Dominick A. editor (2003) The Airplane in American Culture, The University of Michigan Press, Ann Arbor, Poleskie, Steve, p 283
 various authors (2006) Die Sichtbarkeeit Der Schrift, Fink Wilhelm Gmbh + Co.KG, Poleskie, Steve, Artflyer, p 53
 Goodwin Susan W. and Whitley, Peggy J. (2007) 99 Jumpstarts for Kids, Libraries Unlimited,

External links
 Where is Stephen (Steve) Poleskie Now? (Blog)
  Stephen Poleskie Web Site

American artists
1938 births
Living people